"Heart of Mine" is a song written by Michael Foster, and recorded by American country music group The Oak Ridge Boys.  It was released in July 1980 as the second single from the album Together.  The song reached number 3 on the Billboard Hot Country Singles & Tracks chart.

Chart performance

References

1980 singles
The Oak Ridge Boys songs
Song recordings produced by Ron Chancey
MCA Records singles
1980 songs